Polyommatus achaemenes is a butterfly of the family Lycaenidae. It was described by Skala in 2002. It is only known from very high altitudes (ranging from 3,800 to 4,000 meters) in the Iranian Zagros Mountains (Kuh-e-Haft, Bakhtiari).

References

Butterflies described in 2002
Polyommatus
Butterflies of Asia